Sari Ibrahim Khoury (March 13, 1941 – June 18, 1997) was a Palestinian-American visual artist originally from Jerusalem. He primarily worked in abstract modes in acrylic, oil and charcoal.

Early life
Sari Ibrahim Khoury was born in Jerusalem, Mandate Palestine in 1941. Years after becoming a refugee in 1948 and his family's eviction from Jerusalem, he emigrated to the United States to attend school. In a personal statement from 1996, he described the impact the loss of Palestine had on him:

Drawing was a form of therapy and coping for him at an early age.

Emigration to the United States
After spending the remainder of his time in Palestine in Bir Zeit, Khoury came to the United States at age 17 on a fine arts scholarship to Ohio Wesleyan University. There, he earned a Bachelor of Arts and completed his Master of Fine Arts at Cranbrook Academy of Art in Detroit. He married his wife, Suheila Ghannam, in 1967. Together, they had three sons.

Career and exhibitions
Khoury began his academic career as professor of fine art  at Berea College, KY and subsequently at Central Michigan University in Mt. Pleasant, MI. He taught painting and drawing for 31 years.

Khoury began teaching at Central Michigan University in the Art Department in 1967. He served as chairperson of the department from 1992 to 1993. On July 21, 2001, the Board of Trustees of Central Michigan University recognized posthumously that Khoury be promoted to professor emeritus rank.

His works have been exhibited in the United States, Europe, Japan, and in Palestine. His exhibition roster includes fifteen solo exhibits, some posthumous, and over forty group exhibits. A major commissioned mural sits at the Arab Community Center for Economic and Social Services in Dearborn, MI highlighting the accomplishments and contributions of Arab Americans. In 2008, the Arab American National Museum opened a major retrospective of his work. Shortly after, Birzeit University Virtual Gallery also created an online retrospective. In 2019, the newly opened Museum of the Palestinian People in Washington DC houses a painting and drawing in its collection.

Illness and Death
Khoury was diagnosed with an aggressive form of brain cancer in 1996. Khoury died in June 1997.

Public involvement
Khoury was an active participant in Arab-American life in Michigan. He frequently spoke and wrote articulately against war and on Palestinian justice. Many of his writings, photos and other archival material are held at the Bentley Historical Library at the University of Michigan. They form part of a historical collection on Arab, Muslim, and Assyrian Americans in Michigan. In 1987, Khoury was commissioned by the Arab Community Center for Economic and Social Services (ACCESS) to paint a mural depicting Arab-American life, social, professional and cultural contributions to Michigan. It is housed and displayed in the renovated ACCESS office in Dearborn, MI.

Style
The Palestinian artist and historian, Samia Halaby referred to the moment when she first discovered Khoury's works, through personal correspondence: 

Khoury describes the free-style line both as an independent object and edge of a shape as an important characteristic of his work in the 1990s.

Khoury references the works of modern artists Paul Klee, Ben Nicholson, Arshile Gorky, and Wassily Kandinsky as sources of inspiration.

References

External links
 Estate of Sari Khoury on Instagram
 Estate of Sari Khoury on Twitter
 The Artwork of Sari Khoury
 Arab-American National Museum Page on Sari Ibrahim Khoury
 Bir Zeit University Virtual Gallery Exhibit

Palestinian artists
1941 births
1997 deaths
Berea College faculty
Palestinian emigrants to the United States
Central Michigan University faculty